Indulis Emsis (born 2 January 1952) is a Latvian biologist and politician. He was Prime Minister of Latvia for ten months in 2004, the first Green politician to lead a country in the history of the world. He was Speaker of the Saeima, the Latvian parliament from 2006 to 2007. Emsis' political views are described as rather conservative, unusual for members of green parties around the world.

Early life 
Emsis graduated from Riga First Secondary School in 1970, and graduated from the University of Latvia with a degree in biology in 1975. In 1986, he received PhD, also in biology. Until 1990, he worked as a research scientist in environmental science. From 1976 to 1987 Emsis worked as a research associate at the scientific production association "Silava", and head of its labor protection laboratory between 1987 and 1989. Emsis also worked as deputy chairman of the Soviet Latvia's State Nature
Protection Committee.

Start of political career 
In 1990, he became one of founders of Latvian Green Party (LZP) and served as Minister for the environment in the 1990s, working especially for a clean Baltic Sea. He is currently one of the three chairpersons of the Latvian Green Party, which forms a part of Union of Greens and Farmers.
Emsis was included on the Green ticket for the 5th Saeima elections in 1993. Emsis was appointed special assignments minister of natural protection in
Ministry of Environmental Protection and Regional Development in the government of Valdis Birkavs in 1993. Emsis also held the office in the government of Māris Gailis in 1994.

Emsis was elected to the 6th Saeima from the ticket of LNNK/LZP in 1995. As a
member of the 6th Saeima, Emsis was elected to the parliament's Economic Policy
Committee. Emsis was appointed special assignments minister of environment in
the ministry of Environmental Protection and Regional Development when Andris Šķēle's government was approved in 1995. Emsis again assumed the post when Šķēle returned with a new government in 1997, and also held it in the government of Guntars Krasts.

In 1996, Emsis was awarded the Three Star Order (3rd category). In 1998, Emsis was appointed head of a task force to prepare a development
program for Latvia's small ports, and chairman of committee for assessment of
conformity of beaches and yacht ports.
In 1998, Emsis joined the parliamentary group of the Labor Party, Union of
Christian Democrats and LZP. He was included on the three parties' joint ticket
for the 7th Saeima elections.
In 1998, Emsis assumed the post of Prime Minister Vilis Krištopans' non-staff
advisor on environmental protection issues.

In 2000, LZP congress nominated Emsis as the party's candidate for Riga mayor
ahead of municipal elections. Emsis was elected to the Riga City Council form
LZP ticket in March 2001, he worked as deputy chairman of the city council's
City Development Committee.

In October 2002, Emsis was included on the ZZS ticket for the 8th Saeima
elections. Emsis was elected to Saeima, and was appointed deputy chairman of the ZZS parliamentary group. Emsis was elected head of the Economic, Agricultural,
Environmental and Regional Policy Committee, he also worked on the Public
Expenditure and Audit Committee.

As prime minister 
After the resignation of New Era Party leader Einars Repše's government, President Vaira Vīķe-Freiberga assigned Emsis to form a new government; the Saeima voted Emsis' government in office in March 2004.

On 9 March 2004, he became the prime minister of Latvia, leading a centre-right minority government consisting of The Greens and Farmers union, Latvia's First Party and Latvian People's Party. For most of time, the government was also supported by the leftist National Harmony Party.

Emsis was the first member of a Green party to become Prime Minister of a country. On 28 October 2004, the government fell as the Saeima voted 39–53 against the government's budget proposal for the year 2005. He left office on 2 December 2004, when parliament confirmed Aigars Kalvītis of the People's Party as Prime Minister.

Speaker of Saeima 
Emsis returned to the Saeima in December 2004. In October 2006, Emsis was elected to the 9th Saeima from the ticket of the Union of Greens and Farmers. On 7 November 2006, he was elected Speaker of Saeima, defeating Sandra Kalniete of the New Era Party by 74 votes to 22.

COVID-19 
On 12 December 2021, Emsis made public statements on COVID-19 treatment very far removed from the scientific consensus.

References 

1952 births
Living people
People from Limbaži Municipality
Latvian Green Party politicians
Prime Ministers of Latvia
Ministers of the Environment of Latvia
Speakers of the Saeima
Deputies of the Supreme Council of the Republic of Latvia
Deputies of the 6th Saeima
Deputies of the 8th Saeima
Deputies of the 9th Saeima
Riga State Gymnasium No.1 alumni
University of Latvia alumni